Caterina Vitale (1566–1619) was the first female pharmacist and chemist in Malta, and the first female pharmacist of the Knights Hospitaller.

Caterina Vitale was originally from Greece.  She married Ettore Vitale, pharmacist of the Knights Hospitaller, when she was a teenager. Upon his death in 1590, she inherited his pharmacy and the task of providing pharmacies to the Sacra Infermeria.  She was described as a successful businessperson, became very rich, and is known as a benefactor of the Carmelites. 

Being in an uncommon position for a woman, she was a controversial person and the subjects of legends, libelous slander and rumours, and was accused of being an enterprising prostitute, litigator and sadistic torturer of slaves. 

She died in 1619 at Syracuse and her body was brought to Valletta and buried at the Carmelite Church. To the left and right as you enter the church are her tombstone, and the tombstone of Caterina Scappi, the founder of the first hospital for women in Malta.

Upon her death she bequeathed part of her fortune and her property Selmun Palace to the Monte della Redenzione degli Schiavi which worked to free the Maltese who had fallen into slavery. She also left legacies to the Order of Malta, to her niece, to the Carmelites, to the Greek Church, but left nothing to her daughter.

See also
Selmun Palace
Timeline of women in science

Further reading
The nuns who lived off the proceeds of prostitution

References

1566 births
1619 deaths
16th-century Maltese people
16th-century women scientists
17th-century Maltese people
17th-century women scientists
Maltese women scientists
Maltese people of Greek descent
Women pharmacologists
Women chemists
16th-century businesswomen
17th-century businesswomen